Chernavka is a rural locality (a selo) and the administrative center of Chernavsky Selsoviet, Zavyalovsky District, Altai Krai, Russia. The population was 385 as of 2013. There are 10 streets.

Geography 
Chernavka is located on the Kulunda plain, 33 km southwest of Zavyalovo (the district's administrative centre) by road. Kamyshenka is the nearest rural locality.

References 

Rural localities in Zavyalovsky District, Altai Krai